The Norwegian Directorate for Civil Protection (DSB) is a Norwegian government agency under the Minister of Justice and the Police. DSB's general purpose is to protect Norway and its citizens from accidents, disasters, and other incidents.  Examples of areas of responsibility for the DSB include prevention, crisis management, studies and analysis, civil/military cooperation, training, evaluation, and supervision.  In addition, civil defense is subject to regulation by the DSB, as is cyber security.  The DSB is also involved in international crisis coordination groups.

The DSB is based in Tønsberg, with 20 civil defense districts, five civil defense camps, five schools, and five regional offices for electrical inspections. The DSB has about 670 employees, of whom about 240 are based at the main office in Tønsberg. DSB also has operational responsibility for the government's central plant in Hole in Buskerud, a war headquarters for the government.

References

External links 
 Official site

Government agencies of Norway
Organisations based in Tønsberg
2003 establishments in Norway